In mathematics, the Satake isomorphism, introduced by , identifies the Hecke algebra of a reductive group over a local field with a ring of invariants of the Weyl group.

Statement
Classical Satake isomorphism.
Let  be a semisimple algebraic group,  be a non-Archimedean local field and  be its ring of integers. It's easy to see that  is grassmannian. Then the Satake isomorphism is a algebra isomorphism from the category of spherical functions to the -invariant part of the aforementioned cocharacter variety. In formulas:
.

Geometric Satake isomorphism.
As Ginzburg said , "geometric" stands for sheaf theoretic. Then, the geometric Satake isomorphism is
,
This can be obviously simplified to
,
which is a fortiori an equivalence of  Tannakian categories .

Notes

References
 
 
 

Representation theory